Briskebyen is a neighborhood in Gjøvik, around the street Storgata. Briskebyen was a working-class district, made up of wooden houses built in the area before 1865. Most of these houses were destroyed between 1960 and 1970. They were replaced by high-rise flats and the hospital at Haugtun. The area is named after Briskeby in Oslo, which was also a working-class district. 

Gjøvik